Milan Vápenka (4 May 1943 – 1 February 2013) was a Czech volleyball player. He competed in the men's tournament at the 1972 Summer Olympics.

References

1943 births
2013 deaths
Czech men's volleyball players
Olympic volleyball players of Czechoslovakia
Volleyball players at the 1972 Summer Olympics
Sportspeople from Prague